The English suffix -th may form:
ordinal numerals
verbal nouns
the archaic 3rd person singular form, see Early Modern English